Shrimati Indira Gandhi College (also known as SIGC) is a women's college located in Tiruchirappalli, Tamil Nadu, India. The college was established in 1984 by K. Santhanam and is affiliated with Bharathidasan University.

History 
The educationist K. Santhanam founded the college in 1984, offering two courses taught by ten teachers. It is one of the first two colleges in the State founded simultaneously and exclusively for women. It was named after the former Indian prime minister Indira Gandhi; a statue of her is on display in its grounds.

In 1934, Mahatma Gandhi visited the campus of SIGC, which was used by the National College High School at that time.  He addressed the staff and students of the school.  A peepal tree, referred to as The Gandhi Tree, with plaques in English and Tamil, commemorates the occasion.

References 

Universities and colleges in Tiruchirappalli
Colleges affiliated to Bharathidasan University